17 Hundred 90 Inn & Restaurant (also stylized as 17Hundred90 Inn & Restaurant) is a historic inn, restaurant and tavern in Savannah, Georgia, United States. Located on East President Street, just west of Columbia Square, it is Savannah's oldest inn, occupying a building dating to 1790, thus pre-dating the foundation of the square. The entrance to its tavern is at the corner of Lincoln Street and East York Street.

The property, which is situated in the Savannah Historic District, occupies what was originally three separate residences. The western part of the building (on Lincoln Street), built around 1822 by Steele White, was a duplex. The smaller eastern section, meanwhile, was built by the Powers family in 1888. The ground level is believed to be part of an earlier structure that was burned in the Savannah fire of 1820.

The inn also owns a three-story guest house across East York Street.

Anna Powers, a former resident of one of the three properties from the late 18th century into the early 19th century, supposedly jumped out of one of its windows to her death after an argument with her love interests, an English sailor who had gone AWOL to be with her. Another version is that Powers was pushed to her death, possibly by another female who was in love with the same sailor. Her ghost reportedly haunts the property.

The inn was featured in a season 2 episode of My Ghost Story.

See also
 Buildings in Savannah Historic District

References

External links
The 17 Hundred 90 Inn's official website

Restaurants in Savannah, Georgia
Taverns in Georgia (U.S. state)
Hotels in Savannah, Georgia
Houses completed in 1790
Reportedly haunted locations in Georgia (U.S. state)
Columbia Square (Savannah) buildings
Savannah Historic District